Astathes janthinipennis is a species of beetle in the family Cerambycidae. It was described by Fairmaire in 1895. It is known from China, Vietnam, Taiwan and Laos.

Subspecies
 Astathes janthinipennis cyanoptera Gahan, 1900
 Astathes janthinipennis flava Chiang, 1963
 Astathes janthinipennis janthinipennis Fairmaire, 1895
 Astathes janthinipennis yunnanensis Breuning, 1956

References

J
Beetles described in 1895